KERV (1230 AM) is a radio station licensed to Kerrville, Texas, United States, and serving the Kerrville-Fredericksburg area. The station is currently owned by Jam Broadcasting, LLC.

Previous logo

References

Translators
KERV broadcasts on the following translator:

External links

ERV
Radio stations established in 1982
1982 establishments in Texas